Philip James Clark III (October 3, 1931 – September 14, 2018) was an American professional baseball player. Born in Albany, Georgia, he attended Georgia Southern University and was a United States Navy veteran of the Korean War.

Clark appeared in 14 games (all in relief) over two Major League seasons with the 1958–59 St. Louis Cardinals, dropping his only two decisions, allowing 19 hits, issuing 11 bases on balls and striking out six in 14⅔ innings. He earned one save. However, he was a memorable and sympathetic figure in The Long Season, the breakthrough memoir of the 1959 baseball season written by his teammate Jim Brosnan.  Clark and his family were neighbors of the Brosnan family during spring training in St. Petersburg, Florida, and the two pitchers became friends. While Brosnan was an established Major League pitcher, Clark was a fringe player constantly worried about being sent back to the minor leagues. As it turned out, both players were cast off by the Cardinals that season: Clark was sent to Triple-A Omaha at the May cutdown and later traded to the Los Angeles Dodgers; Brosnan was traded to the Cincinnati Reds in early June.

Clark was a successful minor league pitcher, going 81–58 over his career and posting 18 and 16-victory seasons, the latter in the Double-A Texas League. After leaving baseball, he was a teacher, coach and assistant school principal in his native Albany, retiring in 1988.  Clark died in Nashville, Tennessee, at the age of 86.

References

External links

1931 births
2018 deaths
Albany Cardinals players
Baseball players from Georgia (U.S. state)
Columbus Cardinals players
Columbus Red Birds players
Houston Buffaloes players
Major League Baseball pitchers
Omaha Cardinals players
Omaha Dodgers players
St. Louis Cardinals players
St. Paul Saints (AA) players
Sportspeople from Albany, Georgia
United States Navy personnel of the Korean War